The East of England Championships also called the East of England Lawn Tennis Championships was a men's and women's grass court tennis tournament founded in 1885 as the Felixstowe Open Lawn Tennis Tournament. In 1889 the event had by this time become a regional level tournament that ran until 1983 when it lost its status as a senior international tour level event. However the championships are still being staged today as the East of England and an LTA British Tour (Premier Event).

History
The Felixstowe Open Lawn Tennis Tournament hosted by the Felixstowe Cricket and Lawn Tennis Club became a regional level tour event called the East of England Championships in 1889. It was located Felixstowe, Suffolk, South East England.

The tournament was usually staged in mid-August, this later changed the middle or third week of July following the Wimbledon Championships. The East of England Championships ran for 98 years before it was discontinued in 1983 as a senior international tour level event. However the championships are still being staged today as the East of England and an LTA British Tour (Premier Event).  

This tournament became an interrelating regional event to the North of England Championships (f.1884), the South of England Championships (f.1881) and the West of England Championships (f.1881).

Notable winners of the men's singles championship title included Reggie Doherty (1906), Herbert Roper Barrett (1897-1899, 1901-1902, 1910), George Hillyard (1907-1908), Héctor Cattaruzza (1926), Jiro Yamagishi (1934-1935, 1937), George Worthington (1949), Jan Leschly (1957-1957), Mark Cox (1963, 1965-1967) and Saeed Meer (1977). 

Former women's singles winners included Dorothea Douglass Chambers, (1902, 1906-1908, 1910-1911), Geraldine Ramsey Beamish  (1921-1922), Elsie Goldsack Pittman (1931-1932), Jadwiga Jędrzejowska )1937),  Shirley Bloomer (1954), Jill Blackman (1966), Patti Hogan (1967) and Greer Stevens (1973).

Notes
In the late 1880s and an East of England tournament was established in Filey, North Yorkshire, but was predominantly a local tennis meeting only.

Event names
 Felixstowe Open Lawn Tennis Tournament (1885-87)
 East of England County Lawn Tennis Championships (1889-96)
 East of England Championships (1897–1967)
 East of England Open Championships (1968–72)
 East of England Tournament (1973)
 East of England Championships (1974–82)

References

Sources
 Daily Mail Year Book. (1966) London: Associated Newspapers Groups.
 Events. clubspark.lta.org.uk. Felixstowe Lawn Tennis Club.
 The Ipswich Journal. (14 August 1886) Ipswich, Suffolk, England.
 The Sketch: (1924) A Journal of Art and Actuality. Ingram brothers. 110: 127.

Defunct tennis tournaments in the United Kingdom
Grass court tennis tournaments